Fried Fish, Chicken Soup and a Premiere Show  is a 2011 documentary, Indian Meitei-English bilingual film directed by Mamta Murthy and produced by Madhusree Dutta. It is presented by Majlis. The movie won the National Film Award for Best Arts/Cultural Film at the 59th National Film Awards. It had participated in many international film festivals like South Asian International Film Festival, New York; CPH:DOX Copenhagen and Asiatica Film Mediale, Rome.

The movie got selection in the Bandra Film Festival 2021.

Synopsis
Set in Manipur, a conflict region on the remote India-Burma border, the film journeys across a century to paint a portrait of a cinema and its citizens. The film centers around shooting, production and release of the 2010 Manipuri movie 21st Century's Kunti.

Cast 
 Manaobi MM
 H. Neki
 Y. Gandhi
 Muhindro
 Gokul Athokpam
 Maya Choudhury
 Denny Likmabam
 Bala Hijam
 Joseph Thokchom

Accolades
The movie won the National Film Award for Best Arts/Cultural Film at the 59th National Film Awards. The citation for the National Award reads, "For taking us on a journey that chronicles the struggle to produce films in strife torn Manipur and in the process painting a vivid canvas, which captures cinema in the state as a medium of popular culture".

It also won the International Jury Award at the Mumbai International Film Festival 2012. The film bagged the Best Documentary Award at the 6th SIGNS Festival, Kerala 2012.

References

External links
 

2010s Meitei-language films
2012 films
Cinema of Manipur